The Constant Husband is a 1955 British comedy film, directed by Sidney Gilliat and starring Rex Harrison, Margaret Leighton, Kay Kendall, Cecil Parker, George Cole and Raymond Huntley. The story was written by Gilliat together with Val Valentine, and the film was produced by Individual Pictures, Gilliat's and Frank Launder's joint production company. Because the film got caught up in the 1954 bankruptcy of British Lion Film Corporation, it was not released until more than seven months after it had been finished and reviewed by the British Board of Film Censors.

Plot
A man (Rex Harrison) wakes up in a hotel room in Wales, suffering from amnesia. He has no recollection of who he is, why he is there, or where he comes from. With the help of psychologist Doctor Llewellyn (Cecil Parker), they trace a wife and home in London, but they go on to discover that she is just one of many women whom he has bigamously married.

Main cast

 Rex Harrison as William Egerton
 Cecil Parker as Llewellyn
 Sally Lahee as The Nurse
 Kay Kendall as Monica Hathaway
 Nicole Maurey as Lola
 Valerie French as Bridget
 Ursula Howells as Ann
 Jill Adams as Joanna Brent
 Roma Dunville as Elizabeth
 Robert Coote as Jack Carter
 Raymond Huntley as J.F. Hassett
 Noel Hood as Gladys
 Eric Pohlmann as Papa Sopranelli
 Marie Burke as Mama Sopraneli
 George Cole as Luigi Sopranelli
 Derek Sydney as Giorgio Sopranelli
 Guy Deghy as Stromboli
 Margaret Leighton as Miss Chesterman
 Eric Berry as Counsel for the Prosecution
 Michael Hordern as Judge
 Charles Lloyd-Pack as The Solicitor
 Arthur Howard as Clerk of the Court
 John Robinson as Secretary
 Michael Ripper as Left Luggage Attendant
 Muriel Young as Clara
 Sam Kydd Uncredited

Production
The film was made in Shepperton Studios, with shooting finished in early June 1954, just a week after the studio's owner and the film's intended distributor, British Lion Film Corporation, went into receivership on 1 June 1954. The opening scenes were filmed on location at New Quay and Aberaeron, Ceredigion, Mid Wales, and others at Kensington, Millbank, Wormwood Scrubs, Holborn, and St. Paul's, London. When the film was screened by the censors at BBFC on 10 September 1954, it was submitted by Frank Launder's company Launder Productions, as it did not yet have a new distributor. In January 1955, Launder, Gilliat and the Boulting brothers formed a new company, British Lion Films Ltd., which took over the running of Shepperton as well as British Lion's distribution business, and the film finally received its world premiere at the London Pavilion on 21 April 1955.

Gilliat says the film was plagued by problems with the color stock.

Reception
According to the National Film Finance Corporation, the film made a comfortable profit.

According to Kinematograph Weekly it was a "money maker" at the British box office in 1955.

External links

References

1955 films
1955 comedy films
British comedy films
Films about amnesia
Films set in Wales
Films set in London
Films directed by Sidney Gilliat
Films scored by Malcolm Arnold
1950s English-language films
1950s British films